1860 in archaeology

Explorations
 Ernest Renan visits the Roman temple of Bziza.

Excavations
 Giuseppe Fiorelli takes charge of excavations at Pompeii.
 Ernest Renan makes excavations at Byblos.
 Excavation of Holyhead Mountain Hut Circles on Holy Island, Anglesey, off the coast of Wales.

Finds
 Édouard Lartet discovers stone tools (of a type already found in England) at Aurignac.
 Cornet De Groot rediscovers Muara Takus Buddhist temple complex in Indonesia.

Publications

Births
 July 15 - Max von Oppenheim, German Near Eastern archaeologist (d. 1946).
 November 8 - Francis J. Haverfield, English Romano-British archaeologist (d. 1919).

Deaths

See also
 List of years in archaeology
 1859 in archaeology
 1861 in archaeology

References

Archaeology
Archaeology by year
Archaeology
Archaeology